The Fire is a 1916 Italian silent film directed by Giovanni Pastrone. It is loosely based on the novel The Flame by Gabriele D'Annunzio.

Cast 
 Pina Menichelli - Poet
 Febo Mari - il pittore Mario Alberti
 Felice Minotti

References

External links 

http://www.silentfilm.org/archive/il-fuoco

1916 drama films
1916 films
Films based on works by Gabriele D'Annunzio
Films directed by Giovanni Pastrone
Italian silent feature films
Italian black-and-white films
Italian drama films
Silent drama films